Whitekirk and Tyninghame is a civil parish in East Lothian, Scotland, which takes its name from the two small settlements of Whitekirk and Tyninghame.  The two separate ancient parishes were joined in 1761.

See also 
 List of listed buildings in Whitekirk and Tyninghame, East Lothian

External links 
 Parish boundary map and historical statistics, from the Vision of Britain website

East Lothian